The 2011 All Japan Indoor Tennis Championships was a professional tennis tournament played on carpet courts. It was the 15th edition of the tournament which was part of the 2011 ATP Challenger Tour. It took place in Kyoto, Japan between 7 and 13 March 2011.

ATP entrants

Seeds

 Rankings are as of February 28, 2011.

Other entrants
The following players received wildcards into the singles main draw:
  Toshihide Matsui
  Takao Suzuki
  Kento Takeuchi
  Yasutaka Uchiyama

The following players received entry from the qualifying draw:
  Tiago Fernandes
  Peter Gojowczyk
  Sho Katayama
  Cedrik-Marcel Stebe

Champions

Singles

 Dominik Meffert def.  Cedrik-Marcel Stebe, 4–6, 6–4, 6–2

Doubles

 Dominik Meffert /  Simon Stadler def.  Andre Begemann /  James Lemke, 7–5, 2–6, [10–7]

External links
ITF Search
ATP official site

All Japan Indoor Tennis Championships
Carpet court tennis tournaments
All Japan Indoor Tennis Championships
2011 in Japanese tennis